Bonhomme, Bon Homme or Bonhommes may refer to:


Places
 Le Bonhomme, a village and commune in the Haut-Rhin département of north-eastern France
 Col du Bonhomme, Vosges Mountains, France, a mountain pass
 Bonhomme, a community in the city of Chesterfield, Missouri, United States
 Bonhomme Township, St. Louis County, Missouri
 Bonhomme Creek, Missouri
 Bon Homme County, South Dakota, United States

Other uses
 Bonhomme (surname)
 Brothers of Penitence, a religious order also known as the Bonhommes
 Bonhomme, a name used for the heretical Albigensian sect's Elect Parfait
 Bonhomme, the ambassador of the Quebec City Winter Carnival and Ryerson University Frost Week
 "Bonhomme", a song by Georges Brassens, French singer-songwriter and poet

See also
 Grand Bonhomme, a mountain on the island of Saint Vincent
 "Petit bonhomme", the Luxembourgish entry in the Eurovision Song Contest 1962
 Bonhomme Richard (disambiguation), several meanings
 "Jacques Bonhomme", a nickname for Guillaume Cale (died 1358), leader of the Jacquerie
 Jacques Bonhomme, a derisive name given to French peasants by the nobility - see Jacquerie